Francis Hunt Gould (16 October 1881 – 6 June 1915) was an English first-class cricketer and British Army officer.

The son of a British Army captain, he was born at Ross-on-Wye in October 1881. He was educated at Repton School. After completing his education, he enlisted in the British Army and was commissioned as a second lieutenant in the 3rd (Militia) battalion of the Hampshire Regiment in March 1900; both his parents were from Andover in Hampshire. He was promoted to lieutenant in June 1902, and transferred to a posting with the regular army in the Middlesex Regiment in January 1903, at which point he returned to the rank of second lieutenant. He was re-promoted to lieutenant in December 1905. Gould later served with the regiment in British India, where he played club cricket for the Ballygunge district of Calcutta. He made a single appearance in first-class cricket while in India for the Europeans cricket team against the Hindus at Poona in the 1913/14 Bombay Presidency Match. Batting twice in the match, he was dismissed for 4 runs by Palwankar Baloo  in the Europeans first innings, while in their second innings he was unbeaten on 27. 

Seven months after his promotion to captain in January 1914 the First World War began. He returned home with the Middlesex Regiment, which was immediately sent to the front in France. Gould was killed on 6 June 1915 in an accident at Armentières. He is buried at the Cite Bonjean Military Cemetery.

References

External links

1881 births
1915 deaths
Military personnel from Herefordshire
People from Ross-on-Wye
People educated at Repton School
Royal Hampshire Regiment officers
Middlesex Regiment officers
English cricketers
Europeans cricketers
British Army personnel of World War I
British military personnel killed in World War I
Accidental deaths in France